Samarka is a rural locality (a selo) and the administrative center of Samarsky Selsoviet of Loktevsky District, Altai Krai, Russia. The population was 590 as of 2016. There are 4 streets.

Geography 
Samarka is located in the valley of the Zolotukha River, 14 km southeast of Gornyak (the district's administrative centre) by road. Uspenka is the nearest rural locality.

Ethnicity 
The village is inhabited by Russians, Germans and others.

References 

Rural localities in Loktevsky District